Parasenecio is a genus of flowering plants in the groundsel tribe within the sunflower family. Most of the species are Asian, but one (P. auriculatus) occurs in the Aleutian Islands in Alaska.

 Species

References

External links 

Senecioneae
Asteraceae genera